Llanera is the feminine form of the Spanish word llanero. It may refer to:

 Llanera, Nueva Ecija, a municipality in the province of Nueva Ecija, Philippines
 Llanera, Asturias, a municipality in the autonomous community of Asturias, Spain
 Llanera music, music of the Llanero culture in Colombia and Venezuela
 Mariano Llanera (1855-1942), Filipino General
 Llanera, also spelled lyanera, an oval-shaped tin mold used to make leche flan and hardinera in Philippine cuisine